is one of the seven mat holds, Osaekomi-waza, of Kodokan Judo. In grappling terms, it is categorized as a side control hold.

Technique description 
Graphic
from http://judoinfo.com/techdrw.htm

Exemplar Videos:

Demonstrated
from https://web.archive.org/web/20060913144731/http://www.abbotsfordjudo.com:80/techniques/5thkyu.htm

Escapes 
Roll Away Yoko-Shiho-Gatame Escape
Roll Inward (Turn On Knees) Yoko-Shiho-Gatame Escape
Sankaku/Armbar Yoko-Shiho-Gatame Escape

Submissions

Technique history 
During Yasuhiro Yamashita’s winning streak of 203 consecutive victories in international competition in the 1970s and 1980s, yoko shiho gatame was his highest scoring single technique, securing victory in 45 of those contests.

Included systems 
Systems:
Kodokan Judo, Judo Lists
Lists:
The Canon Of Judo
Judo technique

Similar techniques, variants, and aliases 

English aliases:
Side four quarter hold
Side lock pin
Side locking four-corner hold
Variants:
Second variation
Kyuzo Mifune also demonstrates a second variation of Yoko-Shiho-Gatame in the video, The Essence Of Judo, performed from a Stacking Guard Pass.

Modified Yoko-Shiho-Gatame
Mune Gatame
Mune Atama Gatame
Kata Osae Gatame

References

External links

Judo technique